Allison Ball (born August 27, 1981) is an American attorney and politician who serves as the Kentucky State Treasurer. She is a member of the Republican Party.

Early years and career 
Ball is a ninth-generation Eastern Kentuckian. Her family has resided in Eastern Kentucky since the 1790s. She is the daughter of Ron and Amy Ball and has a younger brother, Jonathan.

Ball earned a Juris Doctor from the University of Kentucky College of Law. She worked for the personal injury law firm Vanover, Hall & Bartley. She served for four years as an Assistant Floyd County Attorney prosecuting child abuse and juvenile delinquency cases.

Ball was elected state treasurer in the 2015 elections, defeating state representative Rick Nelson. She was reelected in 2019.

Personal life 
Ball lives in Prestonsburg, Kentucky. She is married to Asa James Swan. On July 3, 2018, Ball gave birth to a son, Levi Adrian Swan, making history by becoming the first statewide officer to give birth while in office.

Electoral history

References

External links
 Campaign site

1981 births
21st-century American politicians
21st-century American women politicians
Kentucky lawyers
Kentucky Republicans
Liberty University alumni
Living people
People from Prestonburg, Kentucky
State treasurers of Kentucky
University of Kentucky College of Law alumni
Women in Kentucky politics